Holy Rosary Academy and High School was a private, Roman Catholic K-12 school in New Orleans, Louisiana.  It is located in the Roman Catholic Archdiocese of New Orleans.

It was in Uptown New Orleans.

Background
Holy Rosary High School also educated students with learning disabilities such as dyslexia, dysgraphia, language delay, academic anxiety, and/or Attention Deficit Disorder.

History
Holy Rosary High School was established in 2005 at 3368 Esplanade Avenue near City Park. The school opened their doors to 33 students, and when Hurricane Katrina hit, 28 students returned to the school. In 2010, the school had up to 150 students. In 2012, the school moved to 2437 Jena St. in New Orleans.

In the 2014–2015 school year, it had 159 students. By 2019 this declined to 110.

In 2019 the archdiocese announced that it was closing in 2019, along with a special needs school in Metairie, Our Lady of Divine Providence School. St. Thérèse Academy for Exceptional Learners in Metairie was established that year to replace the two schools.

Notes and references

External links
 
 
 

Private K-12 schools in New Orleans
Catholic secondary schools in New Orleans
Educational institutions established in 2005
2005 establishments in Louisiana
Educational institutions disestablished in 2019
2019 disestablishments in Louisiana
Uptown New Orleans